Beharus is a monotypic genus of assassin bugs belonging to the family Reduviidae. Its one described species, B. cylindripes, is found in South America, though not restricted to the Amazon basin.

The species seems to be associated with Ponerobia bipustulata and Amauroclopius ornatus as all three were found on the same tree (Prioria copaifera).

External links 

Reduviidae
Hemiptera of South America
Monotypic Hemiptera genera
Cimicomorpha genera